Mount Grant can refer to

Canada
 Mount Grant (British Columbia)

South Georgia
 Mount Grant, South Georgia

United States
  Mount Grant (Montana)
  Mount Augusta (Nevada) 
 Mount Grant (Nevada), the highest and most prominent mountain in the Wassuk Range and Mineral County, Nevada
  Healy Peak 
 Mount Grant (Vermont)